Hugh Ross McLeod (1 November 1907 – 23 April 1929) was a Scottish amateur footballer who played in the Scottish League for Queen's Park as a right back. He was capped by Scotland at amateur level.

Personal life 
McLeod died of an attack of rheumatic fever while a student at the University of Edinburgh.

References 

Scottish footballers
Queen's Park F.C. players
Scottish Football League players
Scotland amateur international footballers
Association football fullbacks
1907 births
1929 deaths
People from Ross and Cromarty
Alumni of the University of Edinburgh
Deaths from streptococcus infection